Clarence Lee Alexander (born March 12, 1939) is a former Grand Chief of the Gwich'in of Alaska.  He was 1st Chief of Fort Yukon from 1980 to 1994.  He was raised at "Shoo Taii," the "Happy Hill," which is also known by the name "Alexander Village".  Alexander Village is approximately 20 miles north of Fort Yukon. He co-authored the Gwich'in Dictionary with his wife, Virginia E. Alexander.He has five children and had 8 brothers and sisters. The majority of his family have moved to Fairbanks, Alaska except for one son, his children, and his wife.

He co-founded the Council of Athabascan Tribal Governments with Paul Williams Sr., the former Chief of the Village of Beaver, Alaska .  He is one of four co-founders of, and Chairman of, the Yukon River Inter-Tribal Watershed Council, a group of 70 First Nations and Tribal Governments spanning the Yukon River Watershed dedicated to "the protection and preservation of the Yukon River Watershed" . He is the former Chairman of the Gwichyaa Zhee Corporation, the local ANCSA village corporation. He founded Gwandak radio, KZPA 900 am, which broadcasts from Fort Yukon throughout the area known as the Yukon Flats.

Council of Athabascan Tribal Governments
He is credited, with Paul Williams Sr. of Beaver, with of founding the Council of Athabascan Tribal Governments, also known locally as "CATG".

Yukon River Inter-Tribal Watershed Council
Alexander is credited, along with three others, of founding the Yukon River Inter-Tribal Watershed Council, which consists of 70 Tribes and First Nations spanning the Yukon River Watershed.  The organization is dedicated to preserving clean water.

Awards
November 30, 2004, Clarence Alexander received the 2004 Ecotrust Indigenous Leadership Awardfor his many years of work advocating for environmental justice, tribal rights, and protection of the Yukon River Watershed.

October 20, 2011, Clarence Alexander was awarded the 2011 Presidential Citizens Medal by President Barack Obama.

References

Sources
www.whitehouse.gov
https://web.archive.org/web/20111007105612/http://64.38.12.138/News/2006/014953.asp
http://www.ecotrust.org/indigenousleaders/2004/clarence_alexander.html
http://www.culturalsurvival.org/publications/cultural-survival-quarterly/canada/view-yukon-flats-interview-gwichin-leader-clarence-a
https://web.archive.org/web/20110927150744/http://www.tribalgov.pdx.edu/interviews.php
https://web.archive.org/web/20160916134334/https://sites.google.com/site/mkiemele/thetwo-leggedonesaremissing
http://www.uaf.edu/anla/collections/search/collectionList.xml?collection=KU&name=Gwich%27in&list=author 
https://web.archive.org/web/20110903140833/http://www.akforum.com/keynotes4.htm
https://web.archive.org/web/20110721155059/http://www.catg.org/ourstory.html

1939 births
20th-century Native Americans
21st-century Native Americans
Alaskan Athabaskan people
Gwich'in people
Living people
Native American leaders
Native American writers
People from Fort Yukon, Alaska
Presidential Citizens Medal recipients
Writers from Alaska